Sampo Terho (born 20 September 1977 in Helsinki) is a Finnish politician who served as Minister for European Affairs, Culture and Sports. He is the chairman of Suomalaisuuden Liitto and was earlier a Member of the European Parliament.

Terho graduated from the University of Tampere in 2003 with a Master's degree in Finnish History, and has worked as a researcher in the Finnish National Defence University. He has written a book on the history of capital punishment. Terho has also served as a peacekeeper in Bosnia & Herzegovina. Terho received the second largest number of votes on the Finns Party (then known as the True Finns) electoral list in the 2009 European Parliament elections. He succeeded Timo Soini in the European Parliament when Soini was elected to Parliament of Finland in the 2011 elections. He was re-elected in the 2014 elections.

Terho participated in the 2015 parliamentary elections and was elected to the parliament with 10,067 personal votes. His term in the European Parliament ended on 27 April, when Terho officially accepted the seat in the Finnish Parliament. He subsequently became the chairman of the Finns Party's parliamentary group. On 5 May 2017, he started as the Minister for European Affairs, Culture and Sports in Sipilä Cabinet.

In 2017, Terho ran against Jussi Halla-aho for party chairmanship, but ultimately lost the chairmanship election at the party convention on 10 June. On 13 June, Terho and 19 others left the Finns Party parliamentary group to found the New Alternative parliamentary group which was turned into a new party known as Blue Reform. After the split, the New Alternative group took the Finns Party's place in the cabinet and Terho continued as a Minister.

In 2019 parliamentary elections, Terho was a candidate of the Blue Reform in Uusimaa constituency, but was not elected. After leaving politics, Terho became a writer and published his first book Olev Roosin kyyneleet in January 2021.

Terho wrote a chamber music piece, of around five minutes long, to celebrate Finland's 100 years of independence, for the Kuopio city orchestra. The piece is arranged by Terho with conductor Heikki Elo, who together have orchestrated the piece.

Electoral history

Chairmanship election

European Parliament elections

Parliamentary elections

Municipal elections

Personal life
Terho was married with Maija Sihvonen from 2011 until their divorce in 2019. They have one child together.

References

1977 births
21st-century Finnish writers
Finnish male novelists
Living people
Politicians from Helsinki
Finns Party politicians
Blue Reform politicians
Government ministers of Finland
Members of the Parliament of Finland (2015–19)
Finns Party MEPs
MEPs for Finland 2009–2014
MEPs for Finland 2014–2019
Finnish columnists
University of Tampere alumni